The Moab Khotsong mine is a large mine located in the northern part of South Africa in North West some  southwest of Johannesburg, South Africa.

During the years 1995 and 1996, Moab Khotsong recorded the worst safety statistics in the mining industry.

History
Harmony Gold successfully acquired Moab Khotsong from AngloGold Ashanti Limited on 1 March 2018.

Initially, the mine was named only Moab, which is the name of the original farm on which it has been built and which was commonly believed to mean fertile ground. However, its association with the Biblical Moab prompted workers to request that it be twinned with Khotsong, Sotho for 'peaceful place', and this is now the commonly-used classification.

References 

Uranium mines in South Africa